Ramoji Film City is an integrated film studio facility located in Hyderabad, India. Spread over 1,666 acres (674 ha), it is the largest film studio complex in the world and as such has been certified by the Guinness World Records. It was established by Telugu media tycoon Ramoji Rao in 1996. The Guardian described Ramoji Film City as "city within a city."

It is also a thematic holiday destination and a popular tourism and recreation centre, containing natural and artificial attractions including an amusement park. Around 1.5 million tourists visit the place every year.

History 

The film city is the brainchild of media tycoon and film producer Ramoji Rao, who wanted to build a studio similar to the ones in Hollywood. On procuring the land, he signed art director Nitish Roy to design the complex. According to an executive, the builders kept the land, which at that time consisted of jungles and mountainous terrain, intact, without removing one tree or mountain. It was built in Hyderabad in 1996 in the outskirts of the city in Abdullahpurmet. Maa Naannaku Pelli (1997) was the first film shot in the studio.

Studio facilities 
The studio has sets such as forests, gardens, hotels, a railway station, an airport, apartment blocks, mansions and workshops etc. There is a central kitchen for the various film units shooting at any given point of time. The film city also has 6 hotels inside it, 47 sound stages and permanent sets ranging from railway stations to temples. The film city has about 1,200 employees, and 8,000 agents. The film city also handles about 400-500 films per annum in various Indian languages. On any given day, it has the capacity to facilitate 15 shoots.

Tourism 
People can visit the film sets, theme parks, amusement rides, etc. The film city also has the set used for the films Baahubali: The Beginning (2015) and Baahubali 2: The Conclusion (2017); all the statues and props used in the films can be seen here. Around 1.5 million tourists visit the place every year.

See also
 Telugu Cinema
 Prayag Film City
 Noida Film City
 Film City, Mumbai
 Film and Television Institute of India
 State Institute of Film and Television

References

External links

 Ramoji Film City
 On the Back Lot at the Other Bollywood 
 History of Ramoji Film City

Culture of Hyderabad, India
Indian film studios
Film production companies based in Hyderabad, India
Tourist attractions in Hyderabad, India
Amusement parks in Hyderabad, India
Amusement parks opened in 1996
Indian companies established in 1996
Mass media companies established in 1996
Ramoji Group
1996 establishments in Andhra Pradesh
20th-century architecture in India